Apatelodes erubescens is a moth in the family Apatelodidae. It is found in Brazil.

The larvae feed on Byrsonima pachyphylla and Byrsonima verbascifolia.

References

Natural History Museum Lepidoptera generic names catalog

Apatelodidae
Moths described in 1929